Georgina Bakani (born 6 December 1996) is a Papua New Guinean footballer who plays as a defender for Kimbe FC and the Papua New Guinea women's national team.

Notes

References

1996 births
Living people
Women's association football defenders
Papua New Guinean women's footballers
Papua New Guinea women's international footballers